Hansjörg Tauscher (born September 15, 1967 in Oberstdorf) is a retired German alpine skier. His best career achievement in the World Cup was third place in a downhill race in Garmisch in January 1992, but he surprisingly won the downhill race at the WC 1989 in Vail.

External links
 
 
 

1967 births
Living people
German male alpine skiers
Olympic alpine skiers of West Germany
Olympic alpine skiers of Germany
People from Oberstdorf
Sportspeople from Swabia (Bavaria)
Alpine skiers at the 1988 Winter Olympics
Alpine skiers at the 1992 Winter Olympics
Alpine skiers at the 1994 Winter Olympics
20th-century German people